Jeffrey Archer: The Truth is a 2002 BBC satirical comedy drama on the life of Jeffrey Archer, with the title role played by Damian Lewis. Its duration was ninety minutes, and its premiere occurred on 1 December 2002. It was written and directed by Guy Jenkin.

Selected cast
Damian Lewis as Jeffrey Archer
Greta Scacchi as Margaret Thatcher
Polly Walker as Mary Archer
Ben Miller as Roland Moxley-Nemesis
Emily Mortimer as Diana, Princess of Wales
Richard Wilson as Prince Philip, Duke of Edinburgh
Richard Griffiths as Willie Whitelaw
Steven Pacey as Tony Blair
Geoffrey Beevers as Denis Thatcher

References

External links

 Reviews roundup at The Guardian

 

2002 television films
2002 films
Films about Margaret Thatcher
Cultural depictions of Tony Blair
Television series produced at Pinewood Studios
British television films
2002 in British television
2002 in British politics
British political comedy television series
BBC Television shows
Films directed by Guy Jenkin